Star Wars: The Clone Wars is an American computer-animated television series created by George Lucas. It is set in the fictional Star Wars galaxy during the three years between the prequel films Episode II: Attack of the Clones (2002) and Episode III: Revenge of the Sith (2005). Lucas called it a continuation of the previous Genndy Tartakovsky produced 2003 Clone Wars series. Dave Filoni served as supervising director of the series. The series began with a theatrical feature film that was released on August 15, 2008, and debuted on Cartoon Network two months later on October 3, 2008. Episodes had a running time of approximately 22 minutes to fill a half-hour time slot (compared to the 3–15 minute episodes of the previous series). The seventh season was released exclusively on Disney+, where it no longer needed to fit specific time slots, and run times were approximately 24 to 26 minutes.  

In early 2013, Lucasfilm announced that The Clone Wars would be "winding down". Thirteen episodes comprising a new sixth season were made available in the U.S. for streaming on Netflix, along with the entirety of the series, beginning March 7, 2014. A project known as The Clone Wars Legacy adapted unproduced story arcs into other formats, such as comics and novels. The series was revived for a seventh and final season of 12 new episodes, which premiered on Disney+ on February 21, 2020.

The Clone Wars received mostly positive reception at first and later acclaim from critics and became a significant ratings success, becoming one of Cartoon Network's highest-rated shows during its initial run. The series was also nominated for numerous industry awards, including the Daytime Emmy Awards and the Annie Awards.

Some characters created for The Clone Wars have gone on to appear in other works, including the animated series Star Wars Rebels (2014–2018) and live-action series The Mandalorian (2019–present), The Book of Boba Fett (2021–present), and an upcoming spin-off of the former focused on one of The Clone Wars''' main characters, Ahsoka Tano. 

A sequel and spin-off of The Clone Wars, Star Wars: The Bad Batch (2021–present), centers on the titular clone trooper team introduced in The Clone Wars' seventh season, while a spin-off anthology series, Tales of the Jedi (2022–present), centers on Count Dooku and Ahsoka at different stages of their lives before, during, and after the events of The Clone Wars.

 Series overview 
 Setting The Clone Wars is set during the Star Wars prequel trilogy era, taking place over a span of three years in between the films Attack of the Clones and Revenge of the Sith. The protagonists comprise returning characters from the films, including Anakin Skywalker, Obi-Wan Kenobi, Padmé Amidala, Yoda, and Mace Windu, as well as new characters created specifically for the series, such as Anakin's Padawan Ahsoka Tano and clone Captain Rex of the 501st Legion.

The series is centered on the eponymous conflict between the Galactic Republic and the Confederacy of Independent Systems, a separatist movement organized by the Sith Lord Count Dooku. The Jedi Knights of the Republic lead their legions of clone troopers against the Separatist droid armies headed by the cyborg commander General Grievous. Unbeknownst to the galaxy, the mysterious Darth Sidious controls and manipulates both sides of the war as part of his master plan to eliminate the Jedi and create a new governing state under his rule. To that end, the series depicts the gradual deterioration of the Republic into the beginnings of the Empire that Palpatine would make official in Revenge of the Sith. Other antagonists include Dooku's apprentice and assassin Asajj Ventress, infamous bounty hunter Cad Bane, and rogue Sith Lord Darth Maul. 

The series was initially conceived as an anthology, with episodes sharing few narrative connections, but later seasons would feature longer story arcs that span several episodes.

 Synopsis 
 Season 1 
Season one focuses on various battles fought between the Republic and the Separatists. The Jedi compete with Count Dooku and General Grievous in an effort to convince different planetary systems to join their cause. There are also several episodes that do not focus on the conflict with the Separatists, but rather other aspects of the Clone Wars.

 Season 2: Rise of the Bounty Hunters 
Season two focuses on the involvement of bounty hunter characters in the Clone Wars. Darth Sidious hires Cad Bane to steal a holocron from the Jedi Temple that jeopardizes the future of the galaxy's Force-sensitive children; a Separatist droid manufacturing facility on Geonosis creates new weapons that threaten to turn the tide of the war; Grievous increases his attacks on the Republic fleet and overwhelms the Jedi; the Mandalorian terrorist faction Death Watch takes advantage of their planet's neutrality to target the pacifistic Duchess Satine Kryze; and the assassin Aurra Sing mentors the young Boba Fett in seeking revenge against Mace Windu for the death of Boba's father.

 Season 3: Secrets Revealed 
Season three focuses on the development of certain characters as the war rages on. Anakin learns about the nature of the Force and his role as the Chosen One in an ancient Force realm; Ahsoka begins to grow into her own and is faced with several challenges that test her independence as a Padawan; and Asajj Ventress is betrayed by Dooku and left for dead, causing her to return to her Nightsister coven and attempt to exact revenge on Dooku through the use of her own pawn, the Nightbrother Savage Opress. Other episodes explore the democratic role of the Republic Senate in the Clone Wars, and how different planets are affected by the galaxy-wide conflict.

 Season 4: Battle Lines 
Season four focuses on the escalation of the Clone Wars through battles of growing intensity on different fronts. Captain Rex and the 501st Legion are forced to go against their orders and act independently to oppose the rogue Jedi general Pong Krell; Obi-Wan fakes his death and goes undercover as a bounty hunter to thwart a Separatist plot to kidnap Chancellor Palpatine; Ventress abandons her past and becomes a bounty hunter following the Separatists' massacre of the Nightsisters; and Savage finds his long-lost brother, Darth Maul, who seeks revenge against Obi-Wan for his defeat over a decade prior.

 Season 5 
Season five features five main story arcs. In the first one, the Republic helps a group of rebels from Onderon, led by siblings Steela and Saw Gerrera, liberate their planet from Separatist occupation. The second arc focuses on a group of Jedi younglings who, after completing their path to becoming Padawans, have to prove themselves by rescuing Ahsoka from pirates. The third arc revolves around a team of droids who, while undertaking a mission to intercept an encrypted Separatist message, encounter an amnesiac former clone commando and must help him recover his memories to escape the planet they have been stranded on. The fourth arc deals with the return of Darth Maul, who joins forces with Death Watch and other criminal syndicates to take over Mandalore and exact revenge on Obi-Wan. The final arc features Ahsoka being framed for bombing the Jedi Temple and later convicted of being a cold-blooded murderer, she would struggle to prove her innocence leading to her fearing who she can trust and running from the Republic. Though Anakin captures the real culprit that framed Ahsoka, she was left questioning the trustworthiness of the Jedi Council, so she elects to abandon the Jedi Order, leaving Anakin devastated.

 Season 6: The Lost Missions 
Season six consists of four story arcs: clone trooper Fives investigating the premature activation of Order 66 in a fellow trooper's mind, and discovering the truth about the inhibitor chips implanted in each clone's brain, only to be silenced by Palpatine before he can expose it; Padmé trying to help her old flame Rush Clovis expose the corruption in the Intergalactic Banking Clan, which causes tensions in her and Anakin's relationship when he learns about her secret mission and intervenes; Jar Jar Binks and Mace Windu rescuing the captured Queen of Bardotta from a cult headed by the Nightsisters' former leader, Mother Talzin; and Yoda embarking on a journey to learn more about the nature of the Force after he is visited by the spirit of the late Qui-Gon Jinn.

 Season 7: The Final Season 
Season seven consists of three story arcs. The first one is focused on Captain Rex's character, as he, Anakin, and a team of clones with genetic mutations rescue ARC Trooper Echo, previously believed to have been killed in action, and defeat the Separatists on Anaxes with his help. The second one focuses on Ahsoka, who befriends sisters Trace and Rafa Martez and helps them settle a debt with the Pyke Syndicate, while trying to conceal her Force powers because of the sisters' hatred of Jedi. The final arc, which is set concurrently with Revenge of the Sith, depicts the Siege of Mandalore, a battle that had been referenced in previous Star Wars media. Ahsoka reluctantly returns to the Republic to lead an assault alongside Rex and Mandalorian warrior Bo-Katan Kryze against Maul's forces on Mandalore. Once Ahsoka confronted Maul, he shares a haunting vision about her previous master Anakin, and how Palpatine's plan is about to come into full effect with Anakin in the center of it. After Maul is captured, Ahsoka is eager to speak to Anakin about what Maul told her, but while in a Venator-class Star Destroyer, Palpatine executes Order 66, causing Ahsoka to be attacked by her own clone troopers. She manages to restore Rex's free will, and releases Maul to cause a distraction, but he ends up disabling the ship they are on. All three ultimately escape. The final scene of the series shows Anakin, now Darth Vader, finding Ahsoka's lightsaber among the ship's wreckage some time later, and leaving with it in silence.

Episodes

The series started with a theatrically released animated film; this decision was made after the production team watched completed footage of several early episodes for the planned television series, which were ultimately combined into a single feature-length film. Warner Bros. Pictures distributed the film, while subsequent episodes aired separately on Cartoon Network. For the film, Christopher Lee, Anthony Daniels, Samuel L. Jackson, and Matthew Wood reprised their roles as Count Dooku, C-3PO, Mace Windu, and the B1 Battle Droids, respectively, from the live-action movies, but Lee and Jackson did not return for the television series.

On December 5, 2011, a full-length feature cut of one of the Season 3 trilogies of episodes (the one composed by "Nightsisters," "Monster," and "Witches of the Mist") was released for download on iTunes as an uninterrupted movie that was previously shown at selected screenings in 2010. The three episodes were written by Katie Lucas, who had previously written the Season 1 episode "Jedi Crash" as well as the Season 3 episodes "Sphere of Influence" and "Assassin." A repeat of season one aired in "decoded" episode format. Each installment contained unobtrusive text windows giving supplemental information about the characters and events playing out on screen.

The series was cancelled in March 2013, after the conclusion of its fifth season, as a result of The Walt Disney Company's acquisition of Lucasfilm and the decision to remove most Star Wars Expanded Universe works from canon. Despite this, The Clone Wars was one of the few pieces of Star Wars media to remain part of the new continuity established by Disney, and a sixth season was released on March 7, 2014, on Netflix, along with additional media, such as comic books and novels, based on unfinished story arcs that would have been included in the season. On July 19, 2018, Lucasfilm announced at San Diego Comic-Con that The Clone Wars would return with 12 new episodes in a seventh season to be released on Disney+. A trailer for the season was released on April 14, 2019, at Star Wars Celebration Chicago. On August 23, 2019, series creator Dave Filoni announced at the D23 Expo that it will be the final season.

On March 17, 2014, in recognition of the release of the complete series on Netflix, StarWars.com released the official chronological episode order for the first six seasons; this was later updated to include links to the episodes on Disney+.

Cast and characters

Main
 Matt Lanter as Anakin Skywalker, Lom Pyke, Additional voices
 James Arnold Taylor as Obi-Wan Kenobi, Plo Koon, Osi Sobeck, Additional voices 
 Ashley Eckstein as Ahsoka Tano, Additional voices
 Dee Bradley Baker as Clone Troopers, Saesee Tiin, Onaconda Farr, Bossk, Admiral Trench, Additional voices
 Matthew Wood as General Grievous, Battle Droids, Wat Tambor, Poggle the Lesser, Additional voices
 Tom Kane as Narrator, Yoda, Admiral Wullf Yularen, Additional voices
 Catherine Taber as Padmé Amidala, Additional voices
 Terrence C. Carson as Mace Windu, Additional voices
 Corey Burton as Count Dooku / Darth Tyranus, Cad Bane, Ziro the Hutt, Additional voices
 Nika Futterman as Asajj Ventress, Additional voices
 Katee Sackhoff as Bo-Katan Kryze
 Sam Witwer as Darth Maul, The Son, Additional voices

Recurring
 Ian Abercrombie (seasons 1–6) / Tim Curry (seasons 5–6) / Ian McDiarmid (season 7) as Chancellor Palpatine / Darth Sidious 
 Greg Baldwin as Gwarm, Tera Sinube, Additional voices
 Ahmed Best (seasons 1–6) / Phil LaMarr (Credited as B.J. Hughes) (Season 1) as Jar Jar Binks
 Clancy Brown as Savage , Additional voices
 Jim Cummings as Hondo Ohnaka, Additional voices
 Olivia d'Abo as Luminara Unduli
 Anthony Daniels as C-3PO
 Ben Diskin as WAC-47, AZI-3, Additional voices 
 Robin Atkin Downes as Rush Clovis, Cham Syndulla, Additional voices
 Gideon Emery as Lott Dod, Mee Deechi, Additional voices
 Jon Favreau as Pre Vizsla
 Dave Filoni as Embo, Additional voices
 Brian George as Ki-Adi-Mundi, King Katuunko, Additional voices
 Barbara Goodson as Mother Talzin
 Anna Graves as Duchess Satine Kryze, Sugi, Meena Tills, Additional voices
 Jennifer Hale as Aayla Secura, Riyo Chuchi
 Julian Holloway as Almec, Admiral Killian
 Tom Kenny as Nute Gunray, Lt. Tan Divo, Greedo, Additional voices
 Jaime King as Aurra Sing, Additional Voices
 Phil LaMarr as Bail Organa, Kit Fisto, Orn Free Taa, Additional voices
 Daniel Logan as Boba Fett, Clone Cadets
 James C. Mathis III as Gregar Typho
 Jameelah McMillan as Halle Burtoni, Queen Neeyutnee 
 Angelique Perrin as Adi Gallia, Additional voices
 Kevin Michael Richardson as Jabba the Hutt, Additional voices
 Meredith Salenger as Barriss Offee, Additional voices
 Jason Spisak as Lux Bonteri, Additional voices
 Stephen Stanton as Mas Amedda, Tarkin, Additional voices
 Tasia Valenza as Shaak Ti 
 Gwendoline Yeo as Nala Se, Additional voices

Notable guests
 Pernilla August as Shmi Skywalker
 Bob Bergen as Lama Su
 Artt Butler as Captain Ackbar
 Flo Di Re as Jocasta Nu
 Dave Fennoy as Pong Krell
 Mark Hamill as Darth Bane
 Andrew Kishino as Saw Gerrera 
 Liam Neeson as Qui-Gon Jinn
 Simon Pegg as Dengar
 Kath Soucie as Mon Mothma
 George Takei as Lok Durd
 David Tennant as Huyang

Production
At April 2005's Star Wars Celebration III, George Lucas announced that "we are working on a 3-D continuation of the pilot series that was on the Cartoon Network; we probably won't start that project for another year." Lucas hired Dave Filoni after having seen episodes of Avatar: The Last Airbender he had worked on. By July 2005, pre-production had begun on the series, according to Steve Sansweet, head of Lucasfilm fan relations. Sansweet referred to the series as "the next generation of the Star Wars saga, a cutting edge 30-minute, 3-D computer-animation series based on the Clone Wars that take place between Episode II ... and Episode III." Sansweet described the look of the new series as "a melding of Asian anime with unique 3-D animation styling." Primary production took place at the Lucasfilm Animation facility in Singapore.

According to another statement by Sansweet, "Lucasfilm Animation will be hiring a total of about 300 digital artists and others in both California and Singapore locations to produce not only the series but animated feature films in the years ahead." He said about the series, "to get the series underway, Lucasfilm Animation has hired key production and creative talent to lead the development of its first animation project." Sansweet has said that "a large component of the future of Star Wars and Lucasfilm is CGI animation."
Lucasfilm Animation used Autodesk software to animate both the film and the series. The Maya 3D-modeling program was used to create the highly detailed worlds, characters and creatures.

Character designer Kilian Plunkett referred to the character designs from Genndy Tartakovsky's original 2003 Clone Wars series, and animators reviewed designs from the 2D series when creating the animation style. 

In 2007, Rob Coleman divulged that one episode was complete, with 15 more in production, and that he was going to direct five of the first 22 episodes. He revealed that the reaction from licensees was very positive, and that the final assembly of shows was done at Skywalker Ranch. 
Speaking at PaleyFest on March 3, 2007, Lucas revealed that the series would be episodic, and as such would not focus on Anakin Skywalker's story; with episodes dedicated to clone troopers and other characters. Lucas revealed further information in a fan interview, including a new character named Ahsoka Tano, over 100 episodes and a possible appearance by Boba Fett. The first trailer for the series was released on the official Star Wars website on May 8, 2007. In an interview in the September 24, 2007 issue of TV Guide, Lucas confirmed that 39 episodes of the series had been completed.

On April 8, 2007, Ain't It Cool News reported that musician Eric Rigler had recorded music for the series. Rigler disclosed that each planet in the Star Wars galaxy would have its own theme music. The episode Mr. Rigler performed on was based on Bulgarian music and played on Uilleann pipes. Kevin Kiner composed the original score for each episode.

Stuart Snyder, who oversaw Cartoon Network and other Turner Broadcasting System cable networks from 2007 to 2014, said he became interested in the new Clone Wars series immediately upon starting the job in May 2007. Snyder flew out to San Francisco, California to screen several episodes, and told Lucas the only place he wanted to see the show was on Cartoon Network. Snyder wished to create an action/adventure block of shows on Friday night in an attempt to rejuvenate Cartoon Network. Snyder expressed confidence that the shows would help boost ratings: "You catch me at a time where I have a smile on my face because of our internal results. I can say there's a little bit of bragging on the third quarter for us."

Lucas considered excluding the "Young Padawans" arc from Season 5 and airing it separately from The Clone Wars as a feature-length pilot for a spin-off series that never materialized. The pilot movie was shown at Star Wars Celebration. Seasons 6, 7, and 8, were in some form of production at the time of the show's cancellation in March 2013, shortly after Lucasfilm was purchased by Disney.

Release
An online comic released alongside the series depicts story snippets between episodes.

Broadcast
On August 31, 2008, a sneak peek of The Clone Wars was shown on Cartoon Network. The series premiered on October 3, 2008, at 9 p.m. on Cartoon Network. The Clone Wars on Cartoon Network is shown in a 16:9 (1.77:1) aspect ratio, cropped from its original aspect ratio (OAR) of 2.35:1 (as seen in the UK Sky Premiere screenings). The show began airing on their Adult Swim block on March 14, 2009, making the series the first Cartoon Network series to simultaneously air on both Cartoon Network and Adult Swim. The series also aired from January 15 to March 26, 2009, on TNT, making it the first form of animation to air on that channel in over a decade.

The show entered an off-network syndication in 2012, and in the fall of that year Trifecta Entertainment & Media put it into barter syndication. on Weekends It aired on many affiliates on the Independent Stations as well as an affiliates of Fox MyNetworkTV and The CW (the latter network's CW Plus service also carries the program as part of its national schedule). The show has been taken off the air in off-network syndication since fall 2013 due to low costs and was not renewed for Season 2 in the 2013-2014 TV Season due to Disney's completed acquisitions of Lucasfilm Ltd In December 2012.

On March 11, 2013, it was announced that The Clone Wars would be "winding down" to focus on the Star Wars sequel trilogy and a new series, Star Wars Rebels. On February 13, 2014, Netflix announced that starting on March 7, 2014, they would begin the US distribution of the entire TV series, including some previously unreleased director's cuts, and the previously unaired new season dubbed "The Lost Missions". The Netflix distribution of the series, along with the Blu-rays, included versions of some episodes with previously censored material. One of the most well-known edits was the removal of the character Ventress kissing a clone after she had stabbed him with her lightsaber.

The show was removed from Netflix on April 7, 2019. For the revival and final season, the remaining episodes of the series are exclusively available on Disney+. The first episode for Season 7 was released on February 21, 2020, with the final episode being released on May 4 of the same year.

Home media

Warner Bros. Home Entertainment distributed the videodisc releases of the first five seasons, while Walt Disney Studios Home Entertainment handled the videodisc release of the sixth season as Star Wars: The Clone Wars – The Lost Missions.

Apart from the season-by-season videodisc sets, there were also three special DVD releases consisting of four episodes from a particular season that reflected a certain story arc or theme:A Galaxy Divided, an early DVD release of the series which included the four season 1 episodes ("Ambush", "Shadow of Malevolence", "Destroy Malevolence", "Downfall of a Droid")Clone Commandos, another DVD compilation that includes episode five "Rookies" as well as episodes 19 through 21 ("Storm over Ryloth", "Innocents of Ryloth" and "Liberty on Ryloth").Senate Murders, DVD from Season 2 episode Senate MurdersHeroes on Both Sides, DVD from Season 3 episode Heroes on Both SidesPursuit of Peace, DVD from Season 3 episode Pursuit of PeaceDarth Maul Returns, a feature-length "director's cut" edited together from Season 4 episodes "Massacre", "Bounty", "Brothers" and "Revenge" and was initially available exclusively at Target.

Reception
Critical response
The theatrical film that served as the premiere for the series was panned by critics. The series began with generally positive reviews at first and over time the series achieved critical acclaim for its writing, emotional depth, lore expansion and voice acting. On July 11, 2008, television critics were shown a completed episode of the series. The Hollywood Reporter called the footage "likely the most photo-realistic animated TV series ever produced."

 Season 1 
On Rotten Tomatoes, the first season has an approval rating of 69% based on 16 critic reviews, with an average rating of 5.70/10. The site's critical consensus reads, "With an agreeably entertaining first season, Star Wars: The Clone Wars opens a fun, kid-friendly chapter of the franchise's sprawling mythology." On Metacritic, the first season has a weighted average score of 64 out of 100 based on 9 critic reviews, indicating "generally favorable reviews".Slate gave the season a positive review and stated, "The new series aspires to the level of a virtual-reality game. That's both the source of its great visual charm and the key to its emptiness, which is too dull to get worked up about." 

Maureen Ryan of the Chicago Tribune praised the season's "fine" complexity, but criticized its "byzantine" plot and lack of character depth, calling the result an "irritation or boredom". 

In 2009, IGN named The Clone Wars the 89th best animated series, specifically praising the episodes "Rookies", "Cloak of Darkness", and "Lair of Grievous" as having some of the best storylines in the Star Wars Expanded Universe.

 Season 3 
On Rotten Tomatoes, the third season has an approval rating of 100% based on 5 critic reviews, with an average rating of 8/10.

 Season 5 
On Rotten Tomatoes, the fifth season has an approval rating of 100% based on 5 critic reviews, with an average rating of 7.90/10.

 Season 6 
On Rotten Tomatoes, the sixth season has an approval rating of 100% based on 12 critic reviews, with an average rating of 8.90/10. The site's critics consensus reads, "Sophisticated storytelling and quality animation make the sixth season of Star Wars: The Clone Wars a fitting end to the series."

 Season 7 
On Rotten Tomatoes, the seventh season has an approval rating of 100% based on 24 critic reviews, with an average rating of 7.70/10. The site's critics consensus reads, "Thanks to its beautifully animated action-sequences and its impressively layered storytelling, The Clone Wars final chapter affirms its place as one of Star Wars greatest entries."

RatingsStar Wars: The Clone Wars became the most-watched series premiere in Cartoon Network history. The series averaged 4 million total viewers in its debut, according to Nielsen Media Research. Cartoon Network said the Star Wars spin-off ranked as the number one channel among all major animated networks in the time slot among total viewers (the largest in the demographic for any premiere telecast of an original Cartoon series). On July 23, 2010, at the San Diego Comic-Con, Craig Glenday, editor of the Guinness World Records, presented Star Wars: The Clone Wars supervising director Dave Filoni, CG supervisor Joel Aron, and lead designer Kilian Plunkett a certificate proclaiming the cartoon series "the highest rated sci-fi animation currently on television". Tech Times said that, "while the Star Wars prequel films fail to make audiences care about characters like Anakin Skywalker, The Clone Wars succeeds." During May 2020, following the release of the seventh season on Disney+, The Clone Wars became the most streamed digital original show in the United States.

Accolades

Legacy
The animated series Star Wars Rebels (2014–2018) and Star Wars: The Bad Batch (2021–present) continues the story of some characters from The Clone Wars, including Ahsoka, Captain Rex, Maul, and Darth Vader, in addition to story arcs involving Mandalorians, Obi-Wan Kenobi, Hondo Ohnaka, and Saw Gerrera. Forest Whitaker portrayed Gerrera in the live-action film Rogue One (2016). Some of these characters and elements are also featured in the live-action Disney+ streaming series The Mandalorian (2019–present), which Dave Filoni executive produces. An upcoming live-action series focused on Ahsoka is being spun off from The Mandalorian, with Filoni .

 The Clone Wars Legacy 

At the time of cancellation in March 2013, 65 more episodes were in development. Thirteen of these episodes were finished to become part of Season 6: The Lost Missions, but there were still additional arcs that were never released. In September 2014, StarWars.com released details of three story arcs from the unfinished episodes. In 2020, an additional twelve of the unfinished episodes were finished and released on Disney+ as part of the show's seventh and final season.

 Literature 

 Darth Maul: Son of Dathomir 
A four-episode arc continued the story of Maul following the events from the season 5 episode "The Lawless", detailing his escape from Sidious; Maul regains control of the criminal Shadow Collective, and battles Dooku, Grievous, and Sidious. The arc was adapted into a four-part limited comic book series, Darth Maul: Son of Dathomir, which debuted in May 2014.

 Dark Disciple 
An eight-episode arc with Nightsister Asajj Ventress and Jedi Quinlan Vos was adapted into Dark Disciple, a novel by Christie Golden released on July 7, 2015. The story follows Vos partnering up with Ventress, hoping to execute Count Dooku.

 Story reels 
Two arcs consisting each of four episodes were released on the official Star Wars website for free in the form of complete animatics, albeit with unfinished animation as those episodes only went through the earliest stages of production. Both were fully voiced by the cast.

 Crystal Crisis on Utapau 
In September 2014, four unfinished episodes were released on the official Star Wars website. The arc took place on Utapau with Obi-Wan and Anakin investigating an arms deal involving the Separatists and a Kyber crystal. The arc also dealt with Anakin's feelings after the departure of Ahsoka. It was also included in the season 6 Blu-ray.

 The Bad Batch 
The unfinished animatics for The Bad Batch, a four-episode arc, were screened at the Star Wars Celebration convention in Anaheim, California, on April 17, 2015. Scripted by Brent Friedman, it is a four-part story arc focusing on a ragtag unit of clone commandos of the same name. The arc was subsequently released on StarWars.com for free shortly after on April 29, 2015. The completed episodes were aired as the first part of the seventh season. A spin-off sequel series titled Star Wars: The Bad Batch which follows the titular clone trooper team premiered on May 4, 2021.

 Video games 
Seven video games have been released, which are based on the style and character designs of the series.
 Star Wars: The Clone Wars – Lightsaber Duels, a fighting game released on November 11, 2008, for Wii.
 Star Wars: The Clone Wars – Jedi Alliance, an action-adventure game released on November 11, 2008, for Nintendo DS.
 Star Wars: The Clone Wars – Republic Heroes, another action-adventure game taking place between Season 1 and Season 2, released on October 9, 2009, for Microsoft Windows, Xbox 360, PlayStation 3, Wii, PlayStation Portable, PlayStation 2 and Nintendo DS.
 Clone Wars Adventures, an online PC game launched on September 15, 2010, online by Sony Online Entertainment and shut down on March 31, 2014.
 Lego Star Wars III: The Clone Wars, released in March 2011 by TT Games for PlayStation 3, PlayStation Portable, Xbox 360, Wii, Nintendo DS, PC, Mac, and Nintendo 3DS, which further stylizes the characters as part of the Lego Star Wars theme and is mostly based on the first two seasons.
 Star Wars: The Clone Wars Pinball, a virtual pinball adaptation of the series' original run, released in 2013 as a purchaseable add-on for Zen Studios' Star Wars Pinball collection for most seventh- and eighth-generation home video game systems, computers and mobile devices.
 Disney Infinity 3.0, released in September 2015 by Disney Interactive for PlayStation 4, PlayStation 3, Xbox One, Xbox 360, Wii U, Microsoft Windows, iOS and Android, which stylizes select major characters from the show as action figures that become playable only via a toys-to-life NFC system. Each copy of the game comes with the playset, "Twilight of the Republic", which is an alternate storyline set during the Clone Wars era, along with two starting characters, Anakin and Ahsoka. Other characters from the show also appear, although most of them are not playable or are fought as bosses.

Characters and locations from the show have also appeared in the following Star Wars games:
 Star Wars: Galactic Defense, a now-defunct tower defense game released on iOS and Android by DeNA, in which a number of playable champions include characters from the show. Several levels in the main campaign also take place on the planet Felucia, a major Clone Wars hotspot featured in some episodes.
 Star Wars: Galaxy of Heroes, a turn-based RPG also released on iOS and Android by Electronic Arts, where some levels take place on planets depicted in the show (such as Dathomir) and a number of collectible, playable characters are from the show.
 Star Wars: Force Arena, an online MOBA game released on iOS and Android by Netmarble, where an August 2017 update allowed players to recruit characters, vehicles and battle units from the series, as well as battle on planets like Felucia.
 Star Wars Battlefront II'', a video game available on Microsoft Windows, PlayStation 4 and Xbox One, in which players can battle on or directly above planets like Ryloth and Kamino, where some battles in the series were fought. Wood, Taylor, Lanter and Burton also reprise their voice roles for four new playable heroes (General Grievous, Obi-Wan Kenobi, Anakin Skywalker and Count Dooku, respectively) being added to the game's third season in late 2018, themed after the Clone Wars.

Notes

References

External links 

  at 
  at 
  at 
 
 
 

 
2000s American animated television series
2010s American animated television series
2020s American animated television series
2000s American science fiction television series
2010s American science fiction television series
2020s American science fiction television series
2008 American television series debuts
2020 American television series endings
American animated action television series
American animated science fiction television series
American children's animated science fiction television series
American computer-animated television series
American television series revived after cancellation
Animated television series reboots
Animated television series about extraterrestrial life
Annie Award winners
Cartoon Network original programming
Disney+ original programming
Interquel television series
Television series by Lucasfilm
Military science fiction television series
English-language Netflix original programming
Clone Wars
Animated television shows based on films
Toonami